Lomatogonium is a genus of 18 species in the family Gentianaceae, found in cool temperate to subarctic regions of Asia, with two species (L. carinthiacum, L. rotatum) also in Europe and one species (L. rotatum) also in North America. By far the highest diversity is in China, with 16 species.

They are annual or perennial plants, growing to 5–15 cm tall, with a basal rosette of 2–3 cm long leaves, and sometimes secondary whorls of smaller leaves on the flower stems. The flowers are 2 cm across, with the five white to pale blue petals joined at the base.

Species
Lomatogonium bellum
Lomatogonium brachyantherum
Lomatogonium carinthiacum
Lomatogonium chilaiensis
Lomatogonium chumbicum
Lomatogonium cuneifolium
Lomatogonium forrestii
Lomatogonium gamosepalum
Lomatogonium lijiangense
Lomatogonium longifolium
Lomatogonium macranthum
Lomatogonium micranthum
Lomatogonium oreocharis
Lomatogonium perenne
Lomatogonium rotatum
Lomatogonium sichuanense
Lomatogonium sikkimense
Lomatogonium stapfii
Lomatogonium zhongdianense

References

External links

Gentianaceae
Gentianaceae genera
Flora of North America
Taxa named by Alexander Braun